2C-N (2,5-dimethoxy-4-nitrophenethylamine) is a psychedelic phenethylamine of the 2C family.  It was first synthesized by Alexander Shulgin.

Chemistry
The full name of the chemical is 2-(2,5-dimethoxy-4-nitrophenyl)ethanamine.

Salts of 2C-N have a bright yellow to orange color due to the presence of the nitro group, unlike all other members of the 2C family in which the salts are white.

Synthesis
2C-N is synthesized by the mixed acid nitration of 2C-H using sulfuric acid and nitric acid.

Dosage
In his book PiHKAL, Shulgin lists the dosage range as 100-150 mg.  2C-N is generally taken orally, and effects typically last 4 to 6 hours.

Effects
Shulgin accounts his experiences after ingesting 2C-N:
(with 120 mg) This came on very fast--I was aware of it within a half hour, and it got as far as it would go by an hour. There are similarities to MDMA, but missing is the benign anti-stress component. I am light-headed, and there just might be a little eye wiggling. And then it dropped right off to nothing within a couple of hours.

(with 150 mg) There may have been some visual changes, I'm not sure. But the talking was extremely easy. If there were no other things to use, this would be excellent, but there are other compounds available. This doesn't have too high a priority.

(with 150 mg) Am I enjoying it? Not exactly, but I am in a good mood. There is not the light-filled energy that some other materials can provide. By six hours, pretty much baseline. Strange material, but okay. Final score: body +3, mind +2, barely.

Legal status

Canada
As of October 31, 2016, 2C-N is a controlled substance (Schedule III) in Canada.

United States
In the United States, 2C-N is a Schedule 1 controlled substance.

United Kingdom
2C-N and most (possibly all) other compounds featured in PiHKAL are illegal drugs in the United Kingdom.

See also 
 2C (psychedelics)
 Phenethylamine
 Psychedelics, dissociatives and deliriants

References

2C (psychedelics)
Nitrobenzenes